The 2023 WNBA season will be the 27th season for the Los Angeles Sparks of the Women's National Basketball Association, and the first season under Head Coach Curt Miller.

The Sparks hired Miller on October 21, 2022. He previously had coached for the Connecticut Sun - leading the Sun to the Finals in 2022. He also previously served as an assistant coach for the Sparks in 2015.

Transactions

WNBA Draft

Transactions

Roster Changes

Additions

Subtractions

Roster

Schedule

Regular Season

|- 
| 1
| May 19
| Phoenix
| 
| 
| 
| 
| Crypto.com Arena
| 
|- 
| 2
| May 25
| Las Vegas
| 
| 
| 
| 
| Crypto.com Arena
| 
|- 
| 3
| May 27
| @ Las Vegas
| 
| 
| 
| 
| Michelob Ultra Arena
| 

|- 
| 4
| June 2
| @ Phoenix
| 
| 
| 
| 
| Footprint Center
| 
|- 
| 5
| June 3
| Seattle
| 
| 
| 
| 
| Crypto.com Arena
| 
|- 
| 6
| June 6
| @ Seattle
| 
| 
| 
| 
| Climate Pledge Arena
| 
|- 
| 7
| June 9
| Chicago
| 
| 
| 
| 
| Crypto.com Arena
| 
|- 
| 8
| June 11
| @ Minnesota
| 
| 
| 
| 
| Target Center
| 
|- 
| 9
| June 14
| @ Dallas
| 
| 
| 
| 
| College Park Center
| 
|- 
| 10
| June 16
| Minnesota
| 
| 
| 
| 
| Crypto.com Arena
| 
|- 
| 11
| June 18
| Connecticut
| 
| 
| 
| 
| Crypto.com Arena
| 
|- 
| 12
| June 20
| Minnesota
| 
| 
| 
| 
| Crypto.com Arena
| 
|- 
| 13
| June 23
| Dallas
| 
| 
| 
| 
| Crypto.com Arena
|
|- 
| 14
| June 25
| Dallas
| 
| 
| 
| 
| Crypto.com Arena
| 
|- 
| 15
| June 28
| @ Chicago
| 
| 
| 
| 
| Wintrust Arena
| 
|- 
| 16
| June 30
| @ Chicago
| 
| 
| 
| 
| Wintrust Arena
| 

|- 
| 17
| July 2
| @ Atlanta
| 
| 
| 
| 
| Gateway Center Arena
|
|- 
| 18
| July 5
| Atlanta
| 
| 
| 
| 
| Crypto.com Arena
| 
|- 
| 19
| July 9
| @ Phoenix
| 
| 
| 
| 
| Footprint Center
|
|- 
| 20
| July 12
| Las Vegas
| 
| 
| 
| 
| Crypto.com Arena
|
|- 
| 21
| July 20
| @ Minnesota
| 
| 
| 
| 
| Target Center
|
|- 
| 22
| July 22
| @ Dallas
| 
| 
| 
| 
| College Park Center
|
|- 
| 23
| July 25
| Indiana
| 
| 
| 
| 
| Crypto.com Arena
|
|- 
| 24
| July 27
| Indiana
| 
| 
| 
| 
| Crypto.com Arena
|
|- 
| 25
| July 30
| New York
| 
| 
| 
| 
| Crypto.com Arena
|

|- 
| 26
| August 1
| New York
| 
| 
| 
| 
| Crypto.com Arena
|
|- 
| 27
| August 4
| @ Washington
| 
| 
| 
| 
| Entertainment and Sports Arena
|
|- 
| 28
| August 6
| @ Washington
| 
| 
| 
| 
| Entertainment and Sports Arena
|
|- 
| 29
| August 8
| @ Indiana
| 
| 
| 
| 
| Gainbridge Fieldhouse
|
|- 
| 30
| August 12
| Atlanta
| 
| 
| 
| 
| Crypto.com Arena
|
|- 
| 31
| August 19
| @ Las Vegas
| 
| 
| 
| 
| Michelob Ultra Arena
|
|- 
| 32
| August 22
| Phoenix
| 
| 
| 
| 
| Crypto.com Arena
|
|- 
| 33
| August 25
| @ Atlanta
| 
| 
| 
| 
| Gateway Center Arena
|
|- 
| 34
| August 27
| @ Connecticut
| 
| 
| 
| 
| Mohegan Sun Arena
|
|- 
| 35
| August 29
| Chicago
| 
| 
| 
| 
| Crypto.com Arena
|
|- 
| 36
| August 31
| Seattle
| 
| 
| 
| 
| Climate Pledge Arena
|

|- 
| 37
| September 3
| Washington
| 
| 
| 
| 
| Crypto.com Arena
|
|- 
| 38
| September 5
| @ Connecticut
| 
| 
| 
| 
| Mohegan Sun Arena
|
|- 
| 39
| September 7
| @ New York
| 
| 
| 
| 
| Barclays Center
|
|- 
| 40
| September 10
| @ Seattle
| 
| 
| 
| 
| Climate Pledge Arena
|
|-

Standings

Statistics

Regular Season

Awards and Honors

References

External links

Los Angeles Sparks at ESPN.com

Los Angeles Sparks seasons
Los Angeles
Los Angeles Sparks